Alpha Pi Delta Sorority, Inc was founded on June 28, 2010 by several college women with like-minded missions, visions and goals. Their vision was to organize a lesbian sorority Greek Letter organization to promote the cause of services and education by encouraging the highest standards through cultural and educational programs, promoting community service within our communities; fostering the sorority's network, growth, and sisterly love.  that catered to lesbian women of color in order to uplift and uphold unity within the lesbian community.

The two founders are now known as "The Royal Court". On June 28, 2010, Antoinette McIntosh and Christian Jones were officially the founders.

The National Chapter for members who do not have a local chapter in their city is known as the Alpha chapter.

See also
List of LGBT and LGBT-friendly fraternities and sororities

References

LGBT fraternities and sororities
Lesbian organizations in the United States
2010 establishments in Texas
Organizations for LGBT people of color
Organizations for women of color
Student organizations established in 2010
LGBT in Texas